Northside High School is located in the North part of the city of Lafayette, Louisiana, United States; hence "Northside".

Demographics
The school is predominantly African American.

Athletics
Northside High athletics competes in the LHSAA.

Championships
Football
The football team was state runner up in 2005 and 6-4A district champions in 2009 and 2010. 

Basketball
The boys' basketball team won the 4A State Championship in 2006.  

Track and Field
The girls' track and field team have won three back to back to back 6-4A State Championships from 2008 to 2010, and the boys' team won two back to back state championships in 2009 and 2010.

Wrestling
The wrestling team won the 4A State Championship in 2006.

Notable alumni
 Ron Guidry, former pitcher for the New York Yankees
 Perry Stevenson, American high school basketball coach and former basketball player, currently an assistant coach at Louisville's Trinity High School
 Daniel Cormier, American retired professional mixed martial artist and Olympic wrestler
 Dustin Poirier, professional Mixed Martial Artist, former UFC Interim Lightweight Champion
 Bryson Bernard, the creator of the Hit Song “Cupid Shuffle”
 Jarrod Shaw, former NFL offensive lineman
 Keiland Williams, former NFL running back

The School of Choice Program
Northside is a participating school which offers the law studies program which includes a mock trial room. The NHS Law Signature programs consist of law 1 (street law), law 2 (criminal justice and mock trial activities), law 3 (paralegal studies, forensic psychology and mock trial activities) and speech/debate for the law student. Students participate in a regional mock trial competition and host a law week for Northside's social studies classes. During this week, the law students perform a mock trial and conduct activities for the students. The law students also participate in a field trip to Angola and tour the federal courthouse.

Northside is the site of the Engineering Academy, which invites students across the Lafayette area to come from their freshmen year to graduation. The Academy of Engineering has dual purposes. The main goal is to prepare students to be successful in a post-secondary field of study related to engineering or industrial technology. The second goal is to help students determine which specific engineering or industrial technology discipline most appeals to them as a possible career. Courses include engineering I and II, drafting I and II, general technology education and technology education computer applications.

References

External links
Northside High School

Schools in Lafayette, Louisiana
Public high schools in Louisiana